Marsiling is a suburb of Woodlands, Singapore, extends from the north of Woodlands Square to the Woodlands Checkpoint, bordering Malaysia. It presents the older living patterns of Singapore; it is a quieter and much denser estate, often offering a reasonable and larger alternative to other housing options, and houses a large number of elderly and heavy-duty industries.

History

In the late 1990s, a plan was introduced by the Government of Singapore to upgrade existing Housing and Development Board apartment blocks by providing refurbished elevators serving every storey of each block, an additional room at the rear of each flat, and other modernising features. This led to a surge in housing prices. The community of foreigners living in Marsiling has also been increasing.

Politics 
By 2015, Marsiling was merged with Yew Tee in an ongoing review of electoral boundaries that also saw Marsiling-Yew Tee Town Council being formed.

In 2017, Halimah Yacob resigned from the Marsiling-Yew Tee GRC (Marsiling division) to contest for presidency. Halimah Yacob was sworn in as the 8th President of Singapore from 13 September 2017. Since the 2020 Singaporean general election, former Chua Chu Kang GRC MP and Minister of State Zaqy Mohamad represented Marsiling, having to temporarily fill the vacated seat.

References

Places in Singapore
Woodlands, Singapore